A Night in the Lonesome October is a novel by American writer Roger Zelazny published in 1993, near the end of his life. It was his last book, and one of his five personal favorites.

The book is divided into 32 chapters, each representing one "night" in the month of October (plus one "introductory" chapter). The story is told in the first-person, akin to journal entries. Throughout, 33 full-page illustrations by Gahan Wilson (one per chapter, plus one on the inside back cover) punctuate a tale heavily influenced by H. P. Lovecraft. The title is a line from Edgar Allan Poe's "Ulalume" and Zelazny thanks him as well as others – Mary Shelley, Bram Stoker, Sir Arthur Conan Doyle, Robert Bloch and Albert Payson Terhune – whose most famous characters appear in the book.

A Night in the Lonesome October was nominated for the Nebula Award for Best Novel in 1994. A similar theme of conflict surrounding the opening of a gate to another world exists in Zelazny's 1981 novel Madwand.

Plot summary
A Night in the Lonesome October is narrated from the point-of-view of Snuff, a dog who is Jack the Ripper's companion. The bulk of the story takes place in London and its environments, though at one point the story detours through the dream-world described by Lovecraft in The Dream-Quest of Unknown Kadath. Though never explicitly stated, various contextual clues within the story (the most obvious of which being the appearance of Sherlock Holmes or "The Great Detective") imply that it takes place during the late Victorian period.

The story reveals that once every few decades when the moon is full on the night of Halloween, the fabric of reality thins and doors may be opened between this world and the realm of the Great Old Ones. When these conditions are right, men and women with occult knowledge may gather at a specific ritual site to hold the doors closed, or to help fling them open. Should the Closers win, then the world will remain as it is until the next turning, but should the Openers succeed, then the Great Old Ones will come to Earth, to remake the world in their own image, enslaving or slaughtering the human race in the process. The Openers have never yet won. These meetings are often referred to as "The Game" or "The Great Game" by the participants, who try to keep the goings-on secret from the mundane population.

The various "Players" during the Game depicted in the book are archetypal characters from Victorian Era gothic fiction – Jack the Ripper (only ever referred to as "Jack"), Dracula ("The Count"), Victor Frankenstein ("The Good Doctor"), and the Wolf Man (known as "Larry Talbot", the film character's name) all make appearances. In addition, there is a Witch ("Crazy Jill"), a Clergyman (Vicar Roberts), a Druid ("Owen"), a "Mad Monk" ("Rastov" – apparently modeled after Rasputin), and grave robbers or Hermetic occultists ("Morris and McCab" – based either on real-life grave robbers Burke and Hare or a reference to a real hermetic of the time, MacGregor Mathers).

Each Player has a familiar – an animal companion with near-human intelligence that helps complete the numerous preparations for the ritual. The majority of the story describes the interactions and discussions of these familiars, all from Snuff's point of view.

Throughout the book, the Players slowly take sides, form alliances, make deals, oppose one another, and even kill off their enemies. The plot accelerates until the night of October 31, when the rite takes place and the fate of the world is decided.

References

External links
 A Night in the Lonesome October at Worlds Without End

1993 American novels
American fantasy novels
Novels by Roger Zelazny
Halloween novels
Cthulhu Mythos novels